Barnabas Long or Longe was Archdeacon of Cleveland from 1683 to 1685.

Long was born in Pontefract was educated at University College, Oxford.  He became Vicar of Selborne in 1680; Chancellor of Llandaff in 1681, Canon of York in  1682; Rector of Fyfield in 1684, and of Oddington that same year.

He died on 11 April 1865.

References

17th-century English Anglican priests
Alumni of University College, Oxford
Archdeacons of Cleveland
1685 deaths
People from Pontefract